Freedom Child is the fifth studio album by Irish rock band The Script. It was released via Columbia Records and Sony Music on 1 September 2017.

Background 
Speaking about how pop music has turned out since The Script went on a hiatus after their last album No Sound Without Silence, Danny O’Donoghue said "If you take a listen to radio now, there aren’t too many bands - guitar, bass, drums, vocals. Everyone has some kind of production element." The album was announced as members of the band took time out with their families in Ireland after four studio albums since 2008.

"Rain" was released as the first single from the album and their first new song since 2014.

Explaining how the album title was decided, O'Donoghue said "It came from Mark's side... His seven-year-old came up to him one day and asked, 'Dad, what's terrorism?'" The album title was inspired by its song of the same name, which addresses terrorism and the need for harmony. He also mentioned how the album covers many topics.

"Divided States of America", a song on the album was explained by O’Donoghue, who said "We were in America when Trump's inauguration was happening, and you couldn’t walk down the street without seeing how divided America was. The guy selling cigarettes could be a Democrat and the guy he's selling them to could be a Trump supporter."

Critical reception

Matt Collar of AllMusic gave the album a positive review, stating that the album "is a vibrant, immediately engaging effort that finds them nicely balancing their various influences, from slick dance-pop to kinetic R&B and thoughtful, crowd-pleasing anthems." Eleanor of Live Arena also gave the album a positive review but with no score, stating that "the group's confident new sound, that strays away from the rock feel we're used to, strikes listeners with positivity and strength. It's worth a listen."

The album has had several negative reviews, including from Lauren Murphy of The Irish Times, who stated that "it's too long, but more importantly, it's emotionally hollow." Rick Pearson of London Evening Standard also gave the album a negative review, and said that "Truly, the road to musical hell is paved with good intentions." Stephen White of The Last Mixed Tape gave the album a score of 2 out of 10, calling the album "an advert that will top the charts".

Track listing 

Notes
  signifies a co-producer.
  signifies a vocal producer.

Charts

Weekly charts

Year-end charts

Certifications

References

2017 albums
Columbia Records albums
The Script albums